This is a list of characters appearing in the Disney Channel series Violetta. The characters are all fictional, except for celebrity guests who appear as themselves.

Casting
Martina Stoessel was cast in the show at the age of 14, and changed schools to accommodate the show's shooting schedule. The actor Diego Ramos was cast as Violetta's father following an audition in Europe. The actress Lodovica Comello, who plays Francesca, was attending school in Milan when she decided to participate.

In the second season, the show brought back most of its cast, with the exception of Simone Lijoi, Rodrigo Velilla, Artur Logunov and lead actor Pablo Espinosa. Diego Domínguez was brought on to play León's new romantic rival, Diego. In addition, the show held casting sessions for fans of the series in Milan, Naples, and Rome for videos that appeared on Disney Channel Italy

In its third season, the show added French actor Damien Lauretta and Mexican actress Macarena Miguel to the cast.

Main characters

Violetta Castillo
The title character (portrayed by Martina Stoessel) is a talented girl and the protagonist of the original television series. She is intelligent and vivacious with an overprotective father. She is a spontaneous and honest girl. She has a beautifully unique voice that she inherited from her mother, who died in a car crash when Violetta was 5 years old. Violetta just wants to find her own place in the world and to learn more about it. When she returns to Buenos Aires, Violetta discovers her passion for music and starts attending Studio 21 (now On Beat Studio) behind her father's back. There, she makes her first friends and learns more about herself. She also meets two very different boys, Tomas and Leon, who both fall for her. Soon, she finds herself in a love triangle and has trouble deciding who she truly loves. Violetta realizes that music means everything to her and that singing is what she wants to do for the rest of her life. But she knows that her father wouldn't accept it and, out of fear, hides everything from him, complicating their lives even more, until the final episode of season 1, when he hears Violetta singing.

Tomas Heredia
Tomas Heredia (portrayed by Pablo Espinosa) is a very talented guy and one of Violetta's two love interests. He can play the guitar and the piano and attends Studio 21 with a grant from Beto, who hired him as his assistant. Born in Spain, he moved to Buenos Aires with his mother to take care of his grandmother. Tomas falls for Violetta despite her father's attempts. At the end of the first season, Tomas moved back to Spain permanently: so he does not appear for the second and third series.

Germán Castillo
Germán Castillo (portrayed by Diego Ramos) is Violetta Castillo's overprotective father. He is a brilliant engineer, owner of a construction company that does international public and private works of great caliber. He is strict and demanding. Since the death of his wife, Maria, he has overprotected his daughter Violetta, but beneath his rigidity lies a big heart. He had a girlfriend, Jade, whom he considered a good influence on her. But the arrival of Angie, Violetta's tutor completely disturbs him, but not wanting to admit it, ends up falling in love with her while engaged to Jade.

Leonardo "Leon" Vargas
Leon Vargas (portrayed by Jorge Blanco) is Violetta's man. Leon attends On Beat Studio and has a big artistic potential. He used to be a part of the “cool crowd” and was Ludmila's boyfriend. But when he discovered that Ludmila liked Tomas, he broke up with her. To get even, he decides to win Violetta over as she was Tomas' crush but he soon falls in love with her against his will. In Season 2, his new hobby is motocross, and his new rival is Diego.

Ludmila Ferro
Ludmila Ferro (portrayed by Mercedes Lambre) is a glamorous, beautiful talented girl from On Beat Studio, and her only friend is Natalia, but unfortunately, she thinks she's better than any other student. Ludmila was never really in love until she began to have feelings for Federico. That's when love started to change her attitude a bit. But, she kept going on back and forth with her snappy attitude. During the last few episodes of Season 3, Ludmila's attitude was changed forever and was even being nice to Naty.

Ángeles "Angie" Carrara
Angie Ángeles "Angie" Carrará (portrayed by Clara Alonso) is Violetta's tutor and aunt, the sister of Violetta's late mother, María. She works at Studio 21 as the singing teacher, and she has a brilliant voice but doesn't show it that she hides something from Violetta. But later on, Ludmila reveals to Violetta that Angie is her aunt. Violetta was happy but mad that she never told her. But after all that happened, Gérman and Angie get married in the last episode of Season 3.

Recurring characters

Guest stars
College 11 and Rock Bones were the first celebrities to guest star as themselves. They appeared in Episode 34 of Season 1. Rock Bones became recurring characters throughout the show, with band member Sebas serving as Camila's love interest during the show's second season. College 11 made one repeat appearance, participating in a YouMix contest during Season 2.
Bridgit Mendler had a cameo performing "Hurricane" with the guys of Studio 21.
R5 guest starred as themselves on the 70th episode of Season 3, singing "Heart Made Up On You." Band member Ross Lynch appeared as himself on the prior episode.

English voice cast

References

External links

Violetta
Violetta